The 500 meters distance for men in the 2012–13 ISU Speed Skating World Cup was contested over 12 races on six occasions, out of a total of nine World Cup occasions for the season, with the first occasion taking place in Heerenveen, Netherlands, on 16–18 November 2012, and the final occasion also taking place in Heerenveen on 8–10 March 2013.

Jan Smeekens of the Netherlands won the cup, while Joji Kato of Japan came second, and Michel Mulder of the Netherlands came third. The defending champion, Mo Tae-bum of South Korea, ended up in seventh place.

Top three

Race medallists

Standings 
''Standings as of 10 March 2013 (end of the season).

References 

Men 0500